Arthur Frederick Ward (23 April 1912 – October 1998)   was Archdeacon of Barnstaple from 1962 to 1970 and Archdeacon of Exeter from 1970 to 1981.

Early life 
Ward was born in 1912 and educated at Armstrong College, Newcastle.  He began his ordained ministry as a curate at St Michael's Byker. He was then an incumbent at Harpurhey, Nelson-in-Marsden, Paignton and Shirwell with Loxhore.

Notes

1912 births
Archdeacons of Barnstaple
1998 deaths
Archdeacons of Exeter
20th-century English Anglican priests
Alumni of Armstrong College, Durham